Soundararajaperumal Temple may refer to several places:
Soundararajaperumal Temple, Nagapattinam, a temple in Nagapattinam, Tamil Nadu, India
Soundararajaperumal Temple, Thadikombu, a temple in Thadikombu, Tamil Nadu, India